Bodum, Inc. is a Danish-Swiss kitchenware manufacturer headquartered in Triengen, Switzerland. Founded in Copenhagen, Denmark, in 1944 by Peter Bodum, the company was moved to Switzerland in 1978 by his son, Jørgen, who continued to run the company as chief executive.

Among the products Bodum markets are French presses, vacuum coffee brewers (the "Santos"), and double-walled beverage glasses made in China of borosilicate glass. Their products are advertised as BPA free. The company has tried to register "French Press" as a trademark in several territories, but failed in the U.S., and had the trademark expunged in Canada in December 2012. Bodum entered into a partnership agreement with American coffee company Starbucks in November 2016 to sell their French presses. In January 2019, the partnership agreement concluded.

Their kitchenware featured on the set of Star Trek: The Next Generation, most notably a glass mug with black handle from of which Captain Picard drinks his signature Tea, Earl Grey, hot.

See also 

 List of kitchenware brands
 History of Starbucks

References

External links

Glassmaking companies of Denmark
Glassmaking companies of Switzerland
Manufacturing companies of Switzerland
Danish design
Kitchenware brands
Danish companies established in 1944